Dawoud (Arabic: دَاوُد dāwūd) is an Arabic male given name and surname which is a written variant of the male given name Daud. 

It may refer to:

As a given name 
Dawoud Bey (born 1953), American photographer and educator
Dawoud al-Marhoon, Saudi Arabian who as a teenager participated in the Saudi Arabian protests during the 2011 Arab Spring
Dawoud Rajiha (1947–2012), Syrian minister of defense from (2011–2012)
Dawoud Sulaiman (born 1990), Emirati professional footballer

As a surname
Diaa al-Din Dawoud (1926–2011), Egyptian politician and activist
Khaled Dawoud, Egyptian journalist and politician
Youssef Dawoud, (1938–2012), Egyptian actor

See also
 Daoud (disambiguation)
 Daud (disambiguation)
 Dawood (disambiguation)
 Dawud (disambiguation)
 David (name)

Arabic-language surnames
Arabic masculine given names